The Großer Eyberg is a  hill in the southern Palatine Forest in Germany. It lies in the county of Südwestpfalz in the borough of Dahn in an area known as the Dahner Felsenland, a part of the Wasgau, a region which comprises the southern part of the Palatine Forest and the northern part of the Vosges Mountains. It is the highest hill in the western Wasgau.

At the summit of the Eyberg is an 18-metre-high, observation tower, of steel lattice construction, which was built between 1945 and 1949 by the French Army. The tower can only be accessed over unmetalled hiking trails.

References 

Mountains and hills of Rhineland-Palatinate
Mountains and hills of the Palatinate Forest
Dahn